The Theodore Roosevelt Presidential Library will be a museum of action celebrating the life and legacy of Theodore Roosevelt, the 26th president of the United States. It is to be constructed at a site to the west of Medora, North Dakota, near Theodore Roosevelt National Park, which preserves sites associated with Roosevelt's sojourn in North Dakota between 1883 and 1887. The project is in planning stages. A site in the Badlands of Medora was selected in 2020, as well as the design architect Snøhetta and the architect of record JLG Architects.

Design 
The site includes a section of the Maah Daah Hey Trail, and includes grassland and Badland terrain. Congress passed legislation to allow and direct the U.S. Secretary of Agriculture to sell the land, which was owned by the U.S. Forest Service up to this point. The site is on top of a butte near the amphitheater used for the Medora Musical.

An initial field of forty architectural firms was narrowed to fourteen firms, which were all invited to compete to serve as the Design Architect for the library. Twelve firms participated and after a series of interviews & presentations, the Foundation announced three finalists: Snøhetta, Studio Gang, and Henning Larsen. These three firms were provided stipends to develop design concepts. Snøhetta–known for its projects including the National September 11 Museum, Oslo Opera House, and Bibliotheca Alexandrina, among others–was selected in September 2020 to design the library.

Location selection
The Library is being built in North Dakota due in large part to both local and regional enthusiasm for the project, and Theodore Roosevelt's personal connections to the state.

Theodore Roosevelt first came to the North Dakota Badlands on September 8, 1883. Roosevelt arrived with the intent to hunt buffalo, but he subsequently formed a deeper connection with the land–so much so that he invested in two ranches in the area: the Maltese Cross and the Elkhorn. Roosevelt would return after the tragic deaths of both his wife, Alice, and mother, Mittie, on Valentine's Day in 1884. He sought refuge, healing, and strength in the landscape–Roosevelt famously said the region is where the "romance of my life began."

Roosevelt would view his time in North Dakota fondly. He once said that if he was ever forced to retain just one memory from his life, he "would take the memory of my life on the ranch, with its experiences close to Nature and among the men who lived nearest her." Moreover, Roosevelt would credit his time in the region as being formative to understanding not only himself, but the lives of others, famously declaring that he "never would have been President if it had not been for my experiences in North Dakota."

In 2019 the North Dakota Legislative Assembly authorized a $50 million operating endowment for the proposed library, to be made available after the foundation raised $100 million for construction; the Foundation has since reached this milestone, unlocking the $50 million.

Board, staff, and supporters
Linda Pancratz, CEO and Chairwoman of Mountain Capital, is Chair of the Theodore Roosevelt Presidential Library Foundation Board of Trustees.

Former media executive and Roosevelt scholar Edward O'Keefe is the CEO.

Governor Doug Burgum supports the effort, citing the state's "opportunity to build a presidential library in honor of one of the most dynamic, influential, and world-changing presidents in the history of the US,” alongside the library's potential impacts on economic, academic, and tourism development within the state. Theodore Roosevelt V, President Roosevelt's great-great grandson, has also played a prominent role advocating for the library within the state. The Roosevelt family has purchased the 90.3 acres of land the library will be on.

History
In January 2022, the Equestrian Statue of Theodore Roosevelt, which stood outside the American Museum of Natural History in New York City facing Central Park West, was removed and will be on a long-term loan to the Library. The Library has yet to determine how and where the statue will be displayed on the grounds. The statue has generated controversy due to its subordinate depiction of African and Native American figures beside Roosevelt.

References

External links
 Theodore Roosevelt Presidential Library website

Theodore Roosevelt
Libraries in North Dakota
Roosevelt, Theodore
Presidential museums in the United States
Proposed museums in the United States
Museums in Billings County, North Dakota